Badgemore is the site of an ancient manor situated West of Henley-on-Thames in Oxfordshire.

History
William the Conqueror gave Henry de Ferrers a considerable number of manors including Badgemore in Oxfordshire. In the early 19th century the house passed to a Mr Charles Lane and later that century it was acquired by a Mr Richard Ovey, who was High Sheriff of Oxfordshire. In 1884 Ovey commissioned  John Norton to re-model and enlarge the house.

Ovey leased Badgemore to Admiral of the Fleet the Earl of Clanwilliam who received a visit from Carola, Queen of Saxony there in April 1905. Clanwilliam died at Badgemore in August 1907. The house is now a serviced office facility within the grounds of a golf club.

References

Sources
 

Country houses in Oxfordshire